Mahé district is one of the four districts of the union territory of Puducherry, India. It consists of the whole of the Mahé region. Mahé is the smallest district of India by size. The total area of Mahé district is surrounded by North Malabar of Kerala State. Three sides by Kannur District and one side by Kozhikode District. Geographically Mahé district is part of North Malabar.

It is the sixth least populous district in the country (out of 773).

Geography

Demographics
According to the 2011 census Mahé district has a population of 41,816, roughly equal to the nation of Liechtenstein. This gives it a ranking of 635th in India (out of a total of 640). Its population growth rate over the decade 2001-2011 was  13.86%. Mahé has a sex ratio of 1,176 females for every 1,000 males, and a literacy rate of 98.35%.

Religion

Hinduism is the majority religion in Mahé district. Muslims form a significant minority.

Sri Puthalam Bhagavathy Temple in Mahé is an ancient historic temple of Bhagavathi. The legend of the temple relates the events that occurred during the conflict between the French and Indian armies. There is a historic St Theresa Church in Mahé district; it was constructed by the  Christian missionary Ignatius A.S. Hippolytes in 1757 as a part of Mahé Mission.

Tourism

Mooppenkunnu (Hillock)
The Mooppenkunnu is a Hillock. It is a Heritage picnic spot in Mahé district. There are pavements to walk, benches to rest and a restroom facility for the tourists. The hillock contains the historic Light House and is a famous sunset view point.

Walkway

The walkway on the banks of Mahé River is a major tourist attraction. The walkway surrounds around the landscape of the Mahé town. The Walkway has park benches to relax and enjoy the beauty of Mahé River.

Azhimukham
Azhimukham is the estuary of Mahé River and the Arabian Sea. There is a small Tagore Park situated here. Recently there has been a reconstruction which added a 2 km walkway along the bank of river from the estuary towards Mahé Bridge.

See also
 Mahé (disambiguation)
 Karaikal district
 North Malabar
 Puducherry district
 Yanam district

Notes

External links
 

Districts of Puducherry
Mahe district
Year of establishment missing